The 1983–84 Illinois State Redbirds men's basketball team represented Illinois State University during the 1983–84 NCAA Division I men's basketball season. The Redbirds, led by sixth year head coach Bob Donewald, played their home games at Horton Field House and were members of the Missouri Valley Conference.

The Redbirds finished the season 23–8, 13–3 in conference play to finish in a tie for first place. They were the number one seed for the Missouri Valley Conference tournament by virtue of sweeping the season series over the University of Tulsa. They were defeated in a semifinal game to Creighton University.

The Redbirds received an at-large bid to the 1984 NCAA Division I men's basketball tournament. They were assigned to the Midwest Regional as the number eight seed where they defeated the University of Alabama in the first round and lost to DePaul University in the second round.

Roster

Schedule

|-
!colspan=9 style=|Exhibition Season

|-
!colspan=9 style=|Regular Season

|-
!colspan=9 style=|Missouri Valley Conference {MVC} tournament

|-
!colspan=9 style=|National Collegiate Athletic Association {NCAA} tournament

References

Illinois State Redbirds men's basketball seasons
Illinois State
Illinois State